Leinsweiler is a municipality in Südliche Weinstraße district, in Rhineland-Palatinate, western Germany. With other small villages, it forms the “Verbandsgemeinde” (‘collective municipality’) Landau-Land. (Named after the city of Landau).

References

Municipalities in Rhineland-Palatinate
Palatinate Forest
Südliche Weinstraße